Bob's Lake is a lake in the James Bay and Abitibi River drainage basins in the city of Timmins, Cochrane District in northeastern Ontario, Canada.

The primary inflow is an unnamed creek at the northeast, and the primary outflow is Bob's Creek at the southwest, which flows to Porcupine Lake and via the Porcupine River and the Frederick House River to the Abitibi River.

See also
List of lakes in Ontario

References

Lakes of Cochrane District
Geography of Timmins